Mesorhabditis is a genus of nematodes.

Species in the genus Mesorhabditis exhibit an unusual form of parthenogenesis, in which sperm-producing males copulate with females, but the sperm do not fuse with the ovum. Contact with the sperm is essential for the ovum to begin dividing, but because there is no fusion of the cells, the male contributes no genetic material to the offspring, which are essentially clones of the female.

References 

 Problems in New Zealand mushroom production associated with bacterial feeding nematodes (Mesorhabditis sp.). FR Sanderson, JW Marshall, GE Ovenden, HM Stengs - … , 1981/edited by NG Nair, AD …, 1981
 Systematik, Phylogenie und Okologie der holzbewohnenden Nematoden Gruppe Rhabditis (Mesorhabditis) und das Problem" geschlechtsbezogener" … W Sudhaus, 1978

External links 

Rhabditidae
Rhabditida genera